Take Air is an all-you-can-fly airline based in Martinique. It operates scheduled services in the Caribbean.

History

Destinations
Take Air operates scheduled charter flights connecting Martinique with Saint Martin, Antigua, Guadeloupe, Dominica, Saint Lucia, St Vincent, Canouan and Union Island.

Fleet
At March 2007 the Take Air fleet includes:

References

Airlines of Martinique
Airlines of France